The Policy & Resources Committee is the Senior Committee of the system of government in Guernsey. It was created on 1 May 2016 to replace the Policy Council of Guernsey.

Guernsey generally operates a system of government by committees and consensus. There were no registered political parties until 2020. The States of Deliberation is both parliament and executive, but it delegates most of its executive functions to policy-specific committees, which are known as the six principal committees, each of which is run by five political members, all of whom have equal voting power.

Objectives
To provide advice for the States of Guernsey, to develop policies and programmes and to implement such policies when approved relating to:
 Leadership and co-ordination of the work of the States
 Fiscal policy, economic affairs and the financial and other resources of the States
 External relations and international and constitutional affairs
 Other matters which have been delegated to the Committee

Committee
The committee is elected by States Deputies for a period of four years.

The current committee comprises a president and four members.

The president of the committee is the de facto head of government of Guernsey and may be given the title Chief Minister. The vice president may also use the title Deputy Chief Minister.

One person in the committee is nominated as Lead Person for External Affairs; the title Minister for External Affairs is sometimes used.

Election
The 40 States Deputies hold an election to determine the President, with successive rounds of voting continuing until an outright winner is elected. All candidates having to be proposed and seconded.

Shortly afterwards, the newly elected president may name his preferred committee members, however it is the votes of the States Deputies that elect the remaining four committee members. All candidates having to be proposed and seconded.

Avoidance of conflict of interest
No person on the Committee may be a president or member of the six principal committees, or of the Scrutiny Management Committee, the Development & Planning Authority, or the Transport Licensing Authority.

Six principal committees

 Committee for Economic Development
 Committee for Health & Social Care
 Committee for Education, Sport & Culture

 Committee for Employment & Social Security
 Committee for the Environment & Infrastructure
 Committee for Home Affairs

Civil servants
The Policy and Resources Committee is assisted by key civil servants:

 Chief Executive
 Chief Strategy and Policy Officer
 Chief Operating Officer

 States Treasurer
 Chief Information Officer

See also
 Politics of Guernsey
 List of current heads of government in the United Kingdom and dependencies
 Council of Ministers of the Isle of Man
 Council of Ministers of Jersey

References

External links
 States of Guernsey – Policy & Resources Committee

Guernsey
Guernsey
Government of Guernsey
2016 establishments in Guernsey